Kathryn Anne Layng (born September 20, 1960) is an American actress.

Early life
Layng was born in Rockford, Illinois. She attended Thomas Jefferson High School and was the Class of 1978 Homecoming Queen. Layng also graduated from the University of Illinois at Urbana–Champaign.

Career
Layng is best known for her role as nurse Mary Margaret "Curly" Spaulding in the ABC comedy-drama series Doogie Howser, M.D. The series aired from 1989 to 1993, and was her first major screen role.

In 1991, Layng guest starred in the television series Pro and Cons and appeared in the feature film The Marrying Man. After Doogie Howser, M.D. ended in 1993, Layng would guest star in the television series Joe's Life and Diagnosis: Murder. She also performed in the television short film Traveler's Rest in 1993.

In 2012, Layng co-starred in the independent film White Frog, which was produced by her husband, David Henry Hwang.

Personal life
In 1993, Layng married playwright David Henry Hwang. They have two children, Noah David and Eva Veanne. They reside in New York City. In 1996, Layng, along with her husband had bought a chair at the modernism show in Seventh Regiment Armory.

Filmography

References

External links

1960 births
Living people
20th-century American actresses
21st-century American actresses
Actresses from Illinois
American film actresses
American stage actresses
American television actresses
Actors from Rockford, Illinois
University of Illinois Urbana-Champaign alumni